Ancaster Senior Public School (commonly known as ASPS) is a middle school in Ancaster, Ontario, Canada, and is part of the Hamilton-Wentworth District School Board. The school was founded in 1968 and had an enrollment  of 280 students.

Athletics
ASPS is known for many successful sports teams including baseball, track and field, cross country, soccer, basketball, floorball, volleyball, golf, water polo, swimming, flag football, and ice hockey team.

Replacement
A new school on the property of Ancaster High School is expected to replace Ancaster Senior Public School as well as an elementary school.

References

External links
Official web page
School page at the Hamilton-Wentworth District School Board web site

Middle schools in Hamilton, Ontario